Events from the year 1982 in art.

Events
 June 26 – The Paul Delvaux Museum in Saint-Idesbald, Belgium, is inaugurated with Paul Delvaux present.
 July 22 – An 1847 bronze casting of a statue of politician William Huskisson by John Gibson is removed by night from its original plinth in Liverpool (England) by activists because of the subject's support for the slave trade.
 May 23 – Cartoonist Gerald Scarfe's animations play a major part in the success of the film version of Pink Floyd's The Wall, released today.
 December 28 – Snow v Eaton Centre Ltd decided: the Ontario High Court of Justice affirms the artist's right to integrity of his work.
 Andy Warhol "falls in love" with Duran Duran at a Blondie concert.
 Photographer Jacqueline Livingston opens Jacqueline Livingston "A One Artist Gallery" in New York's Soho showing a different body of her work monthly for one year. Livingston and her gallery are placed under FBI surveillance because of accusations of child pornography.

Awards
 Archibald Prize: Eric Smith – Peter Sculthorpe
 John Moores Painting Prize - John Hoyland for "Broken Bride 13.6.82" 
 John Player Portrait Award: Humphrey Ocean

Films
66 Scenes from America

Works

Paintings
 Michael Andrews – Sax AD 832
 Avigdor Arikha – Marie-Catherine
 Wolf Kahn – My Barn on a Summer Night, Hirshhorn Museum
 Henry Moore – The Artist's Hands I (charcoal, wax crayon and ballpoint pen)
 Euan Uglow – Zagi

Other
 Joseph Beuys – 7000 Oaks – City Forestation Instead of City Administration at Documenta 7, Kassel
 Daniel Buren – "Les Guirlandes" (The Garlands  at Documenta 7, Kassel
 John Seward Johnson II – Double Check (sculpture in New York City)
 Joan Miró and Joan Gardy Artigas – Dona i Ocell (tiled sculpture in Barcelona)
 Jean Tinguely and Niki de Saint-Phalle – Fontaine des automates, Paris

Exhibitions

Births
 October 20 – Adela Jušić, contemporary visual artist from Bosnia and Herzegovina
 December 10 – Zuzana Čížková, Czech painter and sculptor
 December 16 – Justin Mentell, American artist and actor (d. 2010)
 María Berrío, Colombian-born graphic artist
 Jeff Gibbons, American artist
 Tris Vonna-Michell, British installation artist
 Approximate date – Bambi, English graffiti artist

Deaths
 January 17 – Juan O'Gorman, Mexican painter and architect (b.1905)
 January 27 – Félix Labisse, French painter and designer (b.1905)
 February 6 – Ben Nicholson, English abstract painter (b.1894)
 June 10 – Gala Dalí, Russian artist's model (b.1894)
 June 29 – Pierre Balmain, French fashion designer (b.1914)
 August 3 – David Carritt, English art historian, dealer and critic (b.1927)
 September 11 – Wifredo Lam, Cuban artist (b. 1902)
 September 17 – Ettore DeGrazia, American impressionist, painter, sculptor and lithographer (b.1909)
 October 9 – Charles E. Brown, English aviation photographer (b.1896)
 October 10 – Jean Effel, French painter, caricaturist, illustrator and journalist (b.1908)
 November 3 – Alejandro Bustillo, Argentine painter and architect (b. 1889)
 November 27 – Radomir Stević Ras, Serbian painter and designer (b. 1931)

References

 
Years of the 20th century in art
1980s in art